Frank Grant (born February 15, 1950) is a former American football wide receiver in the National Football League for the Washington Redskins and the Tampa Bay Buccaneers.  He played college football at Southern Colorado and was drafted in the 13th round of the 1972 NFL Draft.

References

1950 births
Living people
People from Brooklyn
American football wide receivers
CSU Pueblo ThunderWolves football players
Washington Redskins players
Tampa Bay Buccaneers players
East Side High School (Newark, New Jersey) alumni
Players of American football from Newark, New Jersey